The Time Museum (Persian: تماشاگه زمان) or the Hossein Khodadad House (Persian: خانه حسین خداداد) is a museum in Tehran, Iran. The museum specializes in clocks and other time-measuring devices.

History 
The five hectares large garden that surrounds the building possibly existed and had structures in it as far back as the reign of Mohammad Shah Qajar or Naser al-Din Shah Qajar. It was purchased by Hossein Khodadad, an Iranian industrialist, in 1963–1964, and underwent major restructuring and repair. Khodadad lived in the house merely for a year, as the building was later confiscated by the government after the Iranian revolution, and is being used as a time museum since 1999–2000, containing around a thousand old clocks.

It was listed among the national heritage sites of Iran with the number 10868 on 22 January 2004.

Collection
The Time Museum contains a large number of clocks and watches. Other types of measuring devices in its collection include water clocks, hourglasses, sundials, and a variety of clocks that measured time by the progressive burning of an object such as a candle or rope. The museum also holds individual clocks and watches that were owned by notable historical figures.

Images

References 

Museums in Tehran
National works of Iran
Horological museums